American Genius is an American documentary series focusing on the lives of inventors and pioneers who have been responsible for major developments in their areas of expertise and helped shape the course of history. Consisting of eight episodes, it was telecast on the National Geographic Channel from June 1, 2015 to June 22, 2015. Through re-enactments, each episode focuses on the lives of two individuals (or groups) competing with each other in the same field of expertise, illustrating how some of the greatest inventions were made possible by competition between aspirants. Segments of the episodes also consist of interviews by historians and experts in the specific domain under discussion. Apple Inc.'s co-founder Steve Wozniak gave his perspective and thoughts on the episode 'Jobs vs Gates' to several media outlets before the series premiere.

Episodes

Reception
The series received favorable reviews from critics. Melissa Camacho from the Common Sense Media rated it 4 out of 5 stars while concluding “It will encourage the audience to think about the technology we rely on today a little differently”. While Neil Genzlinger from The New York Times described the expert interviews as interspersing and illuminating, he wrote the word 'versus' in the episode titles were unsuitable as several of the inventors had collaborated to work at some point in their lives.

See also
List of programs broadcast by National Geographic Channel
Steve Jobs (film)
America: The Story of Us

References

External links

Jeff Wilburn
Stephen David Entertainment

Documentary television series about technology
History of electrical engineering
National Geographic (American TV channel) original programming
2010s American documentary television series
2015 American television series debuts
2015 American television series endings